NA-56 Rawalpindi-V is a constituency for the National Assembly of Pakistan.

Members of Parliament

1970–1977: NW-28 Rawalpindi-III

1977–2002: NA-38 Rawalpindi-III

2002–2018: NA-52 Rawalpindi-III

2018-2023: NA-62 Rawalpindi-VI

Election 2002 

General elections were held on 10 Oct 2002. Sheikh Rasheed Ahmad an Independent candidate won by 60,649 votes.

Election 2008 

The result of general election 2008 in this constituency is given below.

Result 
Javed Hashmi succeeded in the election 2008 and became the member of National Assembly.

By-election 2010

The by-polls were held in February 2010 and Malik Shakeel Awan was elected to the National Assembly of Pakistan from this constituency as a candidate of Pakistan Muslim League (N) (PML-N). He received 63,888 votes and defeated Sheikh Rasheed Ahmad by a great margin.

Election 2013 

General elections were held on 11 May 2013. Sheikh Rasheed Ahmad of Awami Muslim League won by 95,643 votes and became the  member of National Assembly.

Election 2018 
General elections were held on 25 July 2018.

By-election 2023 
A by-election will be held on 16 March 2023 due to the resignation of Sheikh Rasheed Ahmad, the previous MNA from this seat.

See also
NA-55 Rawalpindi-IV
NA-57 Rawalpindi-VI

References

External links 
Election result's official website
Delimitation 2018 official website Election Commission of Pakistan

62
62